Johann Louis François Vogel (born 8 March 1977) is a Swiss former professional footballer who played as a midfielder. He spent most of his professional with Grasshopper Club Zürich and PSV. In his later career, he played for Milan, Betis, and Blackburn Rovers before returning to Grasshoppers. At international level, he amassed 94 caps scoring twice for the Switzerland national team.

Club career

Early career
Born in Geneva, to German father, and Swiss mother, Vogel joined Swiss amateur club FC Meyrin in his youth, but made the cut into professional football by joining Grasshopper Club Zürich. In his time at Grasshoppers, he usually played central defence or rightback although on occasion, he could be called to feature in a central defensive midfield role.

In his role as a defensive midfield player, in which he uses his ability to pass accurately and to effectively retain possession of the ball, Vogel can be counted on to add depth to either defence or attack.

PSV and Milan
Dutch club PSV sought his services in 1999 and he became a prominent member of the team until he decided to leave to join Milan at the end of the 2004–05 season. In his final season with PSV, he was noted for forming a formidable midfield partnership with Mark van Bommel and Phillip Cocu where the club managed to reach the semi-finals of the Champions League tournament.

Real Betis
On 31 August 2006, he joined Real Betis in an exchange deal for Ricardo Oliveira. Vogel made his Betis debut against Athletic Bilbao on 10 September 2006 at the Manuel Ruiz de Lopera, which Betis won 3–0.

Vogel made his last La Liga appearance for Betis on 19 May 2007 against Tarragona. On 27 December 2007, he agreed to leave Betis after suing them.

Everton confirmed they were in talks to sign the player after being told he could leave his then club Real Betis in July 2007. However the deal hit problems due to Real Betis wanting payment for him.

Blackburn Rovers
On 18 March 2008, he agreed a two and a half year contract (with Blackburn having an option for a further year) with Mark Hughes' Blackburn Rovers. Vogel joined fellow Swiss footballers Stéphane Henchoz and Bruno Berner at Ewood Park, as well as his former PSV-colleague André Ooijer. After receiving International clearance to play for Blackburn Rovers on 25 March, he was given the number 8 shirt by Mark Hughes, the shirt vacated by Robbie Savage after his move to Derby County.

Vogel made his debut for Rovers on 5 April against Tottenham Hotspur.

However, in the 2008–09 season, Vogel found himself frozen out at Ewood Park. He came on as a substitute in a 3–1 defeat by Liverpool.

On 7 April 2009, his contract was terminated by Blackburn Rovers with immediate effect and by mutual consent.
After that, he announced his retirement from professional football.

Grasshoppers comeback
Two and a half years after his retirement, Vogel decided to return to the field again. He made comeback with Grasshoppers where he made his professional debut and appeared in the starting line-up against FC Thun on 5 February 2012. After appearing in another two league matches, he retired for the second time.

International career
Vogel made his debut for Switzerland on 8 March 1995 in a 1–1 draw against Greece. Vogel has played in Euro 1996, Euro 2004, 2006 World Cup and has made 94 appearances in total for his country. He scored his first goal on 10 March 1999 in a friendly against Austria.

Until 8 March 2007, he was the captain of Switzerland.

Career statistics
Sources:

International goals

Honours

Club
Grasshoppers
 Swiss National League A: 1994–95, 1995–96, 1997–98
 Swiss Cup: 1994

PSV Eindhoven
 Eredivisie: 1999–00, 2000–01, 2002–03, 2004–05
 KNVB Cup: 2004–05
 Johan Cruijff-schaal: 2000, 2001, 2003

Individual
 Dutch Footballer of the Year: 2001

References

External links

 

Official La Liga career stats 

Living people
1977 births
Footballers from Geneva
Association football midfielders
Swiss men's footballers
FC Meyrin players
Grasshopper Club Zürich players
PSV Eindhoven players
A.C. Milan players
Real Betis players
Blackburn Rovers F.C. players
Swiss Super League players
Eredivisie players
Serie A players
La Liga players
Premier League players
Swiss expatriate footballers
Expatriate footballers in the Netherlands
Swiss expatriate sportspeople in the Netherlands
Expatriate footballers in Italy
Swiss expatriate sportspeople in Italy
Expatriate footballers in Spain
Swiss expatriate sportspeople in Spain
Expatriate footballers in England
Swiss expatriate sportspeople in England
Switzerland international footballers
UEFA Euro 1996 players
UEFA Euro 2004 players
2006 FIFA World Cup players
Swiss-German people
Swiss-French people